Taylor Ledge is a notable flat-topped ridge displaying abrupt cliffs north and south, situated between Boyce Ridge and Mount Shinn on the west slope of Sentinel Range, Ellsworth Mountains in Antarctica. The upper surface of the feature is ice covered and relatively level except for 3373-meter Knutzen Peak on the north edge.

The ridge was named by the Advisory Committee on Antarctic Names (US-ACAN) in 2006 after Thomas N. and Edith L. Taylor, Department of Ecology and Evolutionary Biology, University of Kansas, Lawrence, husband and wife U.S. Antarctic Project (USAP) researchers of plant fossils in the central Transantarctic Mountains, 1980s–2004.

Location
US mapping in 1961, updated in 1988.

Maps
 Vinson Massif.  Scale 1:250 000 topographic map.  Reston, Virginia: US Geological Survey, 1988.
 Antarctic Digital Database (ADD). Scale 1:250000 topographic map of Antarctica. Scientific Committee on Antarctic Research (SCAR). Since 1993, regularly updated.

References
 Taylor Ledge. SCAR Composite Gazetteer of Antarctica.

Ellsworth Mountains
Ridges of Ellsworth Land